Gliese 205 is a nearby red dwarf star of spectral type M1.5, located in constellation Orion at 18.6 light-years from Earth.

History of observations
A designation of this star, used in "Discovery Name" column of Table 4 of Kirkpatrick et al. (2012), is Strb. 1611. This name was taken from van de Kamp (1930). The origin of this designation is not explained in these articles. Anyway, it is not Struve's 1827 catalogue of binary stars, since for this catalogue another prefix ("Σ") is used, for example, "Σ 2398", and real Σ 1611 is located in completely different part of the sky. Also, Gliese 205 is not a binary star. In the paper, published in Annales de l'Observatoire de Strasbourg in 1926 an object "N** Strasb. 1611" in "5h" sections was listed, so, possibly, this designation relates to the Observatory of Strasbourg. Possibly, it is the "Catalogue de Strasbourge" of 8204 stars, published in Volume 4 of Annales de l'Observatoire de Strasbourg in 1912 — a part of international Astronomische Gesellschaft Katalog (AGK), made by various observatories by 1912. If so, then there are earlier designations).

Of the other designations, the earliest one is W. B. V. 592 or Weisse I, 5h 592 (Maximiliano Weisse; Friedrich Bessel, Positiones mediae stellarum fixarum I, 1846). This catalogue was based on observations, made by Bessel in 1821–1833 and published in 1822–1838 in Astronomische Beobachtungen auf der königlichen Universitäts-Sternwarte in Königsberg as "Beobachtungen der Sterne, nach Zonen der Abweichung angestellt". Gliese 205, probably, was observed on January 8, 1823 in zone 140 (see the 9th abtheilung (1824), page 55, 2nd column, 33rd string).

Search for planets 

In a 2019 preprint, two candidate planets were detected using the radial velocity method. A study of this star in 2023 found no evidence of planets, and determined a stellar rotation period of 34.4 days.

References

Orion (constellation)
M-type main-sequence stars
036395
0205
J05312734-0340356
BD−03 1123
025878
TIC objects